François Goulard (born 21 September 1953 in Vannes) was a member of the National Assembly of France.  He represented the Morbihan department,  and is a member of the Union for a Popular Movement. He has been appointed as minister of transports from 2004 to 2005 and minister of superior education from 2005 to 2007.

In November 2021, he became treasurer of Horizons, a party within President Emmanuel Macron's Ensemble Citoyens coalition.

References

1953 births
Living people
Politicians from Vannes
Liberal Democracy (France) politicians
Union for a Popular Movement politicians
United Republic politicians
Horizons politicians
Government ministers of France
École Centrale Paris alumni
Sciences Po alumni
École nationale d'administration alumni
Deputies of the 12th National Assembly of the French Fifth Republic
Deputies of the 13th National Assembly of the French Fifth Republic